Liu Shaomei (born 16 October 1963) is a Chinese sprinter. She competed in the women's 100 metres at the 1988 Summer Olympics.

References

1963 births
Living people
Athletes (track and field) at the 1988 Summer Olympics
Chinese female sprinters
Olympic athletes of China
Place of birth missing (living people)
Olympic female sprinters